The William H. Sabine House in Syracuse, New York was listed on the U.S. National Register of Historic Places on May 28, 2010.

The Sabine family was a slave-holding family and later it was an abolitionist family.

References

Houses on the National Register of Historic Places in New York (state)
Houses in Syracuse, New York
National Register of Historic Places in Syracuse, New York